The siege of Inverness of 1650 was part of the Scottish Civil War that formed part of the Wars of the Three Kingdoms. Lewis Gordon, 3rd Marquess of Huntly, who was operating under the leadership of the royalist James Graham, 1st Marquess of Montrose, unsuccessfully laid siege to Inverness Castle which was being held by Covenanters of the Clan Fraser of Lovat under Sir James Fraser of Brea.

References

Inverness
Inverness
History of Inverness
1650 in Scotland
Inverness 1650